A Poet in New York is a British drama television film that was first broadcast, in a 60-minute version, by BBC One Wales on 30 April 2014. A longer 75-minute version was later broadcast by BBC Two on 18 May 2014. The film, written by Andrew Davies and directed by Aisling Walsh, explores how Welsh poet Dylan Thomas died in New York at the age of 39. The film was made to mark the centenary of Thomas' birth on 27 October 1914.

Cast
 Tom Hollander as Dylan Thomas
 Essie Davis as Caitlin Thomas
 Ewen Bremner as John Malcolm Brinnin
 Phoebe Fox as Liz Reitell
Samantha Coughlan as Sylvie
Stuart Matthews as Theatre Stagehand
Shane Hart as Audience
 Morfydd Clark as Nancy Wickwire
Lucinda O'Donnell as Brazell
 Aimee-Ffion Edwards as Marianne
Nansi Rhys Adams as Aeronwy Thomas

Production
A Poet in New York was commissioned for the BBC by Janice Hadlow, Ben Stephenson, Adrian Davies and Faith Penhale. The executive producers were Griff Rhys Jones, Rob Warr, Faith Penhale and Bethan Jones. Filming took place in Cardiff and Laugharne over 18 days. Tom Hollander put on two stone in weight to play the role.

Reception
Thomas expert George Tremlett did not understand why the BBC had chosen to commemorate the centenary the poet's birth by making a film about his death.

In The Guardian Stuart Jeffries wrote: "Hollander and Essie Davis as Caitlin performed well youthful concupiscence gone sour." Ceri Radford, in The Daily Telegraph said: "[Hollander] made a startlingly good Thomas, while the script came from one of the few writers who could hope to do the poet justice." and "This was tragedy in the Shakespearean sense: a great man undone by one fatal weakness. ... The production was lush, lyrical and very, very funny." In Financial Times, Antonia Quirke wrote: "We see so many performances based on real people ... actors faced with the gnarled question of whether to impersonate or interpret. ... Tom Hollander gives a performance finely balanced between the two approaches: terrific mimicry, but unpredictable and subtle.".

References

External links
 
 
 A Poet in New York at Modern Television

Films shot in Wales
Cultural depictions of Dylan Thomas
2014 films
2010s English-language films